Samer Takriti is a Syrian management scientist. He received his Ph.D. in Operations Research from the University of Michigan. An expert in energy markets, he worked for Enron in 1999-2000. He has also been a senior manager in the Mathematical Sciences Department at IBM Research. The initiatives of this department were reported on in a BusinessWeek cover story. The story has received substantial media coverage; another paper Takriti contributed to on the impact of outsourcing has also received some media attention.

References
  BusinessWeek - "Math will rock your world", January 23, 2006

External links
 Math will Rock Your World (BusinessWeek)
 New IBM Research Quantifies the Long-Term Impact of IT Outsourcing on Three Business Metrics (Outsourcing Center)
 The Engines of Tomorrow, by R. Buderi (describes research on energy modeling done by S.T. at IBM Research).

Living people
University of Michigan alumni
Year of birth missing (living people)